Rick Pagnutti (born November 14, 1946) is a Canadian former professional ice hockey player who was drafted first overall in the 1967 NHL Amateur Draft by the Los Angeles Kings but never played in the NHL.

Pagnutti spent a ten-year career in the minor leagues, primarily for the Rochester Americans and Springfield Kings of the American Hockey League. He won the Governor's Trophy as the top defenceman in the International Hockey League in 1972. His son Matt Pagnutti played college hockey in the NCAA ranks and professionally in the ECHL.

Career statistics

External links
 

1946 births
Living people
Canadian expatriate ice hockey players in the United States
Canadian ice hockey defencemen
Fort Wayne Komets players
Los Angeles Kings draft picks
National Hockey League first-overall draft picks
National Hockey League first-round draft picks
Oklahoma City Blazers (1965–1977) players
Ice hockey people from Ontario
Rochester Americans players
Salt Lake Golden Eagles (WHL) players
Sportspeople from Greater Sudbury
Springfield Kings players